Bartolomé de Medina may refer to:
 Bartolomé de Medina (theologian)
 Bartolomé de Medina (mining specialist)